Corrugated plastic or corriboard – also known under the trade names of Cartonplast, Polyflute, Coroplast, FlutePlast, IntePro, Proplex, Correx, Twinplast, Corriflute and Corflute – refers to a wide range of extruded twin-wall plastic-sheet products produced from high-impact polypropylene resin with a similar make-up to corrugated fiberboard. It is a light-weight tough material which can easily be cut with a utility knife. Manufacturers typically offer a wide variety of colors and thicknesses (quite commonly 3, 4, 5 mm).

Polycarbonate sheet is sometimes referred to as twinwall plastic.

Chemically, the sheet is inert, with a neutral pH factor. At regular temperatures most oils, solvents and water have no effect, allowing it to perform under adverse weather conditions or as a product component exposed to harsh chemicals.  Standard sheets can be modified with additives, which are melt-blended into the sheet to meet specific needs of the end-user. Special products that require additives include: ultra-violet protection, anti-static, flame retardant, custom colors, corrosive inhibitors, static-dissipative, among others.

Applications
Corrugated plastic is commonly used to erect commercial, political or other types of signs and for constructing plastic containers and reusable packaging. It is widely used in the signwriting industry for making signs for real estate sales, construction sites and promotions.

The last decade has found its increasing use among guinea pig, rabbit, domesticated hedgehog and other small pet enthusiasts as components of DIY cages.  Additionally, it is used by members of the remote-controlled aircraft community to build nearly indestructible SPAD model aircraft.

At least one manufacturer of air-to-air heat exchangers (used in heat recovery ventilation) uses a fused stack of sheets of this material alternating with spacers made of the same material as the heat-exchange medium.  One air stream passes through the corrugated channels in the interior of the sheets, while the other passes between the exterior layers of the stacked sheets.

Recycling
Corrugated plastic is usually made from polypropylene which is capable of being recycled. Resin identification code 5 applies: .

See also
Packaging
Plastic recycling

References

Further reading
 Yam, K. L., Encyclopedia of Packaging Technology, John Wiley & Sons, 2009, .

Corrugation
Plastics
Packaging materials